Colin Philip Lowrie (born 20 June 1936) is an English former stage and television actor, best known for playing Dennis Tanner in the long-running ITV soap opera Coronation Street, from the programme's inception in 1960–1968, and again from 2011 to 2014.

Early life

Born in Ashton-under-Lyne, Lancashire, Lowrie was the son of Philip Lowrie, a foreman in a paper mill, and Bertha Lowrie (née Collins). Lowrie had a stammer so attended elocution lessons at Miss Atherton's Elocution. When he left secondary school, his mother managed to save enough money to pay his fees at the Royal Academy of Dramatic Art in London, where he studied for three years.

Career
At the age of 24, Lowrie appeared in the opening episode of the new Granada Television drama serial Coronation Street as Dennis Tanner, the son of Elsie Tanner (Pat Phoenix) and sister of Linda Cheveski (Anne Cunningham). Lowrie remained with the show as a regular character until 1968. During this period, he recorded a pop single, "I Might Have Known", which was issued by Ember in September 1963. Despite being recorded at the prestigious Abbey Road Studios and produced by John Barry, the record was not a hit.

Lowrie later did the voiceover and auditions for the popular Channel 4 quiz show Fifteen to One. He was a regular performer on comedian Victoria Wood's television shows, appearing in her programmes Victoria Wood's All Day Breakfast, Victoria Wood, The Mall, Pat and Margaret, Live In Your Own Room, We'd Like To Apologise, As Seen On TV and Wood and Walters. His other television appearances have included Andy Capp (1988), Crown Court (1975), War and Peace (1972), East Lynne (1976), The Cuckoo Waltz (1977), The Liver Birds (1978), Galloping Galaxies (1986), Rules of Engagement (1989) and Doctors (2005).

In September 2011, Lowrie was presented with a certificate by the Guinness World Records for being the person with the longest gap between television appearances in the same show, having returned to Coronation Street as Dennis Tanner earlier that year. He made his final on-screen appearance as the character in July 2014.

Lowrie subsequently played Mr Larkin in the ITV series Home Fires in 2015. He also has many West End and stage lead roles on his CV, such as Major Metcalf in The Mousetrap (2004), Klever in The Case of The Frightened Lady (2018) and Eric in The Lady Vanishes (2019).

References

External links
 

1936 births
Alumni of RADA
Living people
People from Ashton-under-Lyne
English male soap opera actors
English gay actors